Bill Patrick may refer to:

Bill Patrick (cricketer) (1885–1946), New Zealand cricketer
Bill Patrick (footballer) (born 1932), Scottish association football player
Bill Patrick (sports anchor) (born 1955), sports anchor for NHL on Versus and NBC Sports
Bill Patrick (Canadian politician)

See also
William Patrick (disambiguation)
Patrick Williams (disambiguation)